Ligotka may refer to the following places in Poland:
Ligotka, Lower Silesian Voivodeship (south-west Poland)
Ligotka, Opole Voivodeship (south-west Poland)